Elion may refer to:

Gertrude B. Elion (1918–1999), American biochemist and recipient of the 1988 Nobel Prize in Physiology or Medicine
, French molecular biologist and geneticist
Elion Enterprises Limited, an Estonian company
Elyon, the highest God in the Canaanite pantheon (along with El)
Elion Group 
eLion electrical bus manufactured by Lion Bus company 
Lawrence Elion (1917–2011), Canadian / British actor
Loup-Denis Elion (born 1979), French actor and singer
Elion, a deer in the book Fire Bringer

See also
Eilon, settlement in Israel